Elymnias ceryx is a butterfly in the family Nymphalidae. It was described by Jean Baptiste Boisduval in 1836. It is found in the Indomalayan realm.

Subspecies
E. c. ceryx (Java)
E. c. ceryxoides de Nicéville, 1895 (Sumatra)

References

External links
"Elymnias Hübner, 1818" at Markku Savela's Lepidoptera and Some Other Life Forms

Elymnias
Butterflies described in 1836